Alice Teague-Neeld (born 2 March 1996) is an Australian netball player in the Suncorp Super Netball league, playing for the West Coast Fever.

Teague-Neeld began her professional netball career as a replacement player for the Melbourne Vixens in the 2014 ANZ Championship season, before permanently being picked up by the Vixens the following year. She was one of the inaugural signings of the Collingwood Magpies team prior to the start of the new Suncorp Super Netball competition in 2017. Considered one of Australia's youngest talents at the time, Teague-Neeld was named vice-captain of the Australian U/21 World Youth squad for 2017. Teague-Neeld struggled to break into the Magpies team on a regular basis during her two years at the club and at the end of the 2018 season she was signed by that year's runners-up the West Coast Fever on a multi-year deal.

Teague-Neeld is the daughter of former Melbourne Football Club coach Mark Neeld.

References

1996 births
Living people
Australian netball players
Victorian Fury players
Melbourne Vixens players
Collingwood Magpies Netball players
West Coast Fever players
Victorian Netball League players
Australian Netball League players
Suncorp Super Netball players
Netball players from Victoria (Australia)